Anna Demetriou (born 1993) is an English actress. In her first starring role since leaving London Academy of Music and Dramatic Art (LAMDA), Demetriou played the Princess Helle of Volsung in Viking Destiny.

Film

Video games

References

External links

Anna Demetriou on YouTube
Anna Demetriou on Instagram
Anna Demetriou on Twitter

English film actresses
1993 births
Living people
Alumni of the London Academy of Music and Dramatic Art